Frederick Joseph Sinnamon (called Paddy; 1895–1970) was an Anglican priest in Canada in the 20th century.

Sinnamon was  educated at Trinity College, Dublin. He was ordained deacon in 1918; and priest in 1919. After curacies at Ballymoney, Darlington and  Bishop Wearmouth he was the incumbent at Bay de Verde from 1928 until 1931. he was Rector of St Thomas, Montreal from 1932 until 1970 (Chaplain with the Royal Canadian Dragoons 1940–45). He was  Archdeacon of Montreal from 1965 until 1970.

References

Alumni of Trinity College Dublin
Alumni of Montreal Diocesan Theological College
20th-century Canadian Anglican priests
Archdeacons of Montreal
Canadian military chaplains
1895 births
1970 deaths